Dennis Salanović (born 26 February 1996) is a Liechtensteiner professional footballer who plays as a midfielder for CF Talavera.

Club career
In 2018, Salanović joined Swiss club FC Thun. 

After playing for AC Oulu in Finland on loan in the 2021 season, on 7 December 2021 he agreed to return to the club on the permanent basis for 2022. On 27 June 2022, Oulu announced that Salanović left the club as his contract expired and the option to extend was not exercised.

On 4 August 2022, he joined another Finnish team, FC Lahti.

On 9 March 2023, he joined Spanish 3rd tier team CF Talavera.

International career
Salanović played his first international game with the senior national team on 4 September 2014 in and against Bosnia and Herzegovina (3–0), after he came on as a substitute for Philippe Erne in the 63rd minute of that game. At the time of his senior debut for Liechtenstein, rumors were abound that Salanović had chosen to represent Bosnia and Herzegovina over the country of his birth, however, four days later, Salanović appeared in Liechtenstein's starting 11 for their UEFA Euro 2016 qualifying match against Russia, thus permanently cap-tying him to the principality. In 2019, Salanović was voted Liechtenstein Footballer of the Year

International goals
Scores and results list Liechtenstein's goal tally first.

Personal life

Salanović's family is from Bosnia and Herzegovina. They moved to Liechtenstein during the Bosnian War.

Honours 
Individual
 Liechtensteiner Footballer of the Year: 2019

References

External links
 
 

1996 births
People from Vaduz
Liechtenstein people of Bosnia and Herzegovina descent
Living people
Liechtenstein footballers
Liechtenstein international footballers
Association football midfielders
FC Schaan players
NK Istra 1961 players
FC Balzers players
FC Rapperswil-Jona players
FC Thun players
AC Oulu players
Croatian Football League players
Swiss 1. Liga (football) players
Swiss Promotion League players
Swiss Super League players
Swiss Challenge League players
Veikkausliiga players
Liechtenstein expatriate footballers
Expatriate footballers in Spain
Liechtenstein expatriate sportspeople in Spain
Expatriate footballers in Croatia
Liechtenstein expatriate sportspeople in Croatia
Expatriate footballers in Switzerland
Liechtenstein expatriate sportspeople in Switzerland
Expatriate footballers in Finland
Liechtenstein expatriate sportspeople in Finland